Super Hits is a 2002 compilation that shuffles most of Wild Cherry's charting hits and combines them with a larger number of album cuts. "Play That Funky Music", along with the other singles -- Hot to Trot, Hold On, I Love My Music -- are included. Baby Don't You Know, the mildly successful Play That Funky Music sound-alike that became the group's second hit, is not.

Track listing
 "Play That Funky Music"
 "99"
 "1 2 3 Kind of Love"
 "I Love My Music"
 "Try a Piece of My Love"
 "Hot to Trot"
 "Hold On [with strings]"
 "Hold On to Your Hiney"
 "Keep On Playin' That Funky Music"
 "Electrified Funk"

References

Wild Cherry (band) albums
2002 greatest hits albums